Avati is a rural locality (a village) in Tosnensnoye Urban Settlement of Tosnensky District, Leningrad Oblast, Russia. The population was 10 as of 2017.

Geography 
Avati is located 24 km south of Tosno (the district's administrative centre) by road. Gorka is the nearest rural locality.

References 

Rural localities in Leningrad Oblast